Arthur Augusto da Silva (born 29 August 1999), commonly known as Arthur, is a Brazilian footballer who plays as a goalkeeper for Portuguese club Feirense.

Club career
On 9 July 2021, he joined Feirense.

Career statistics

Club

References

1999 births
Living people
Brazilian footballers
Brazilian expatriate footballers
Association football goalkeepers
Liga Portugal 2 players
Desportivo Brasil players
Clube Atlético Tubarão players
U.D. Oliveirense players
C.D. Feirense players
Brazilian expatriate sportspeople in Portugal
Expatriate footballers in Portugal